Poolla Tirupati Raju (3 September 1904 – 8 December 1992) was an Indian writer, philosopher, academic and a former professor of Jaswant College, Jodhpur (present day Jai Narain Vyas University. He was the author of several books, both in English and Telugu, on Indian philosophy and literature. His publications include Structural Depths of Indian Thought Telugu Literature, The Philosophical Traditions of India Introduction to Comparative Philosophy and Idealistic Thought of India. He was the editor of The Concept of Man: A Study in Comparative Philosophy, written by Sarvepalli Radhakrishnan. The Government of India awarded him the third highest civilian honour of the Padma Bhushan, in 1958, for his contributions to Literature and education.

He played important part in the modern development of comparative philosophy and brought out Indian philosophy to the attention of the American academy.

Selected bibliography

See also 
 Sarvepalli Radhakrishnan
 M. Hiriyanna

References 

Recipients of the Padma Bhushan in literature & education
1904 births
1992 deaths
Telugu-language writers
Writers from Andhra Pradesh
20th-century Indian writers
20th-century Indian philosophers
Telugu writers
English-language writers from India
20th-century Indian male writers